State Route 259 (SR 259) is an east–west secondary highway that is located entirely in Sumner County in Middle Tennessee.

Route description

SR 259 begins at an intersection with  US 31W/SR 41 on the Kentucky–Tennessee state line. It goes east to pass through the town of Mitchellville, before winding its way southeast through farmland to enter Oak Grove and come to an end at an intersection with SR 52.

Major intersections

References 

259
259